Rebelo or Rebello is a Portuguese surname, also found in people with Portuguese ancestry or of Portuguese descent. This surname is mainly found in Portugal along with a very small distribution among Portuguese descendants in former Portuguese colonies like Brazil, India (Luso-Indians mainly in Goa), Angola, Mozambique and other places. In India, most people from the former Estado da Índia took the anglicised spelling of the surname- "Rebello", but many, especially those of Portuguese descent, kept the original spelling 'Rebelo'.

It may refer to:
Aldo Rebelo (born 1956), Brazilian politician
Baltasar Rebelo de Sousa (1921-2001), Portuguese politician and medicine professor
François Rebello (born 1970), Canadian politician
Henry Rebello (1928-2013), Indian field athlete
Jason Rebello (born 1969), British jazz pianist
João Lourenço Rebelo (1610-1655), Portuguese court composer to king John IV of Portugal 
Joaquim Rebelo (born 1961), Portuguese football player
José Adriano Pequito Rebelo (1892-1983), Portuguese writer, politician and aviator
Jose d'Avellar Rebello (c.1600–1657), Spanish historical painter
Mabel Rebello (born 1950), Indian politician
Marcelo Rebelo de Sousa (born 1948), Portuguese politician, law professor, former journalist, political analyst and 20th President of Portugal.
Paulo Jorge Rebelo Duarte (born 1969), Portuguese football manager
Princeton Rebello (born 1999), Indian football player 
Stephen Rebello (20th and 21st century), United States screenwriter

Portuguese-language surnames